The Pac-12 Conference Men's Soccer Player of the Year is an annual award given to the top performing player in the Pac-12 Conference.

In 2014, the Pac-12 Conference introduced a new award solely for defensive players.

Key

Winners

Player of the Year (2000–present)

Defensive Player of the Year (2014–present)

Offensive Player of the Year (2021–present)

References 

College soccer trophies and awards in the United States
Player of the Year
Pacific 12
Awards established in 2000